Moeen Faruqi (born in Karachi, Pakistan) Urdu: معین فاروقی is an artist and poet residing in Karachi.

His poems have been published in:
 Poetry from Pakistan: An Anthology, Oxford University Press (1997)
 Dragonfly in the Sun: An Anthology of Pakistani Literature, Oxford University Press (1997), Karachi.

 the highest selling price for a piece of his artwork at auction is US$250.00 for "The End of Love,' sold at William H. Bunch Auctions in 2020.

References

External links 
 

1958 births
California State University, Fresno alumni
Living people
Muhajir people
Pakistani poets
Alumni of the University of Wales
Writers from Karachi